The 2019-20 Robert Morris Colonials men's ice hockey season is the 16th season of play for the program and the 10th season in the Atlantic Hockey conference. The Colonials represent Robert Morris University and are coached by Derek Schooley, in his 16th season.

On March 12, 2020, Atlantic Hockey announced that the remainder of the conference tournament was cancelled due to the coronavirus pandemic.

Roster

As of June 28, 2019.

Standings

Schedule and Results

|-
!colspan=12 style=";" | Regular Season

|-
!colspan=12 style=";" | 

|- align="center" bgcolor="#e0e0e0"
|colspan=12|Robert Morris Won Series 2–1
|- align="center" bgcolor="#e0e0e0"
|colspan=12|Remainder of Tournament Cancelled

† Rescheduled from November 29.

Scoring Statistics

Goaltending statistics

Rankings

References

Robert Morris Colonials men's ice hockey seasons
Robert Morris Colonials
Robert Morris Colonials
2019 in sports in Pennsylvania
2020 in sports in Pennsylvania